Sir Gustavus Hume, 3rd Baronet, of Castle Hume, (c.1670 – 25 October 1731) was an Irish landowner and politician.

Hume was the son of Sir John Hume, 2nd Baronet and Sydney Hamilton, and in 1695 he succeeded to his father's baronetcy. He was High Sheriff of Fermanagh in 1701. He was the Member of Parliament for Fermanagh in the Irish House of Commons between 1713 and his death in 1731. In 1714 he was made a member of the Privy Council of Ireland. From 1715 to 1727 he was a Groom of the Chamber to George I of Great Britain. Hume was succeeded in his title by his cousin, Charles Hume.

References

External links
Sir Gustavus Hume, of Castle Hume, 3rd Baronet, Sheriff of Fermanagh
Hume Row and Smith’s Buildings now Ely Place

Baronets in the Baronetage of Ireland
Gustavus
1670s births
1731 deaths
Year of birth uncertain
High Sheriffs of County Fermanagh
Irish people of Scottish descent
Irish MPs 1713–1714
Irish MPs 1715–1727
Irish MPs 1727–1760
Members of the Parliament of Ireland (pre-1801) for County Fermanagh constituencies
Members of the Privy Council of Ireland